The 2008 Vuelta a Asturias was the 52nd edition of the Vuelta a Asturias road cycling stage race, which was held from 3 May to 7 May 2008. The race started and finished in Oviedo. The race was won by Ángel Vicioso of the  team.

General classification

References

Vuelta Asturias
2008 in road cycling
2008 in Spanish sport